John Gordon (born 8 August 1956) is a Jamaican cricketer. He played in sixteen first-class matches for the Jamaican cricket team from 1976 to 1984.

See also
 List of Jamaican representative cricketers

References

External links
 

1956 births
Living people
Jamaican cricketers
Jamaica cricketers
Cricketers from Kingston, Jamaica